Saint Cathan, also known as Catan, Cattan, etc., was a 6th-century Irish monk revered as a saint in parts of the Scottish Hebrides.

Source Material 
This Saint appears in the Aberdeen Breviary, Walter Bower's Scotichronicon, and the Acta Sanctorum, and a number of placenames in western Scotland are associated with him.

Gaelic Christianity 
He is said to have been one of the first Irish missionaries to come to the Isle of Bute, then part of the Gaelic Kingdom of Dál Riata.

Very little is known of him; he is generally only mentioned in connection with his more famous nephew Saint Blane, who was born on Bute and later proselytized among the Picts. Both saints were strongly associated with Bute and with Kingarth monastery, which became the center of their cults.

A number of churches were dedicated to Cathan across Scotland's western islands. Tobar Chattan, or Cathan's Well, at Little Kilchattan on Bute may represent the site of Cathan's original church. Other churches, now in ruins, include St Cathan's Chapel on Colonsay, Kilchattan Chapel on Gigha, and Kilchattan Church on Luing. The Luing church served the historical Kilchattan parish; the modern Kilchattan Church was built at Achafolla in 1936.

Cathan is said to have lived for a time at the monastery at Stornoway on the isle of Lewis, and his relics are said to have been housed at a chapel founded by Clan MacLeod on the same island.

Impact 
Cathan's name survives in the various toponyms in the area containing the element Chattan (where the first consonant is lenited), such as Ardchattan ("Cathan's Heights") and the many places called Kilchattan ("Church of Cathan"). Examples include the names of the hill of Suidhe Chattan and of the village of Kilchattan Bay, both on Bute.

His name may be further connected to the Chattan Confederation, a coalition of Scottish clans.

His feast day is 17 May. Cattanachs are said to be families that followed or were servants of this Saint and include founder families (of Macbean, MacPherson, and MacPhail).

Notes

References

 "The Statistical Account of Buteshire", 1822, from Creag Dubh, No. 18 (1966)

Medieval Irish saints
Medieval Scottish saints
6th-century Irish priests
Irish expatriates in Scotland